21st Century Girls were a teenage all-female band founded in 1996 in Dudley, West Midlands, UK. Previously called She Devil, the band originally consisted of singer Leanne Garner, her sister Fiona Garner on bass, guitarists Kate Turley and Meriam "Mim" Mohammad, and drummer Charlotte Fendek. Fendek later left the band, and Mohammad moved onto drums. In 1999, the band (then aged 14–16 years) were the first signing to Simon Fuller's 19 Recordings. After a big publicity campaign the band released their debut single, "21st Century Girls", in June 1999. The single reached number 16 on the UK Singles Chart.

The band disbanded after they were dropped by their record company in 2000.

Kate Turley went on to form the band The Fight.

Discography

Album
 21st Century Girls (19 Recordings/EMI) (1999) [Japan only release]

Singles
 "21st Century Girls" / "If You're Mad Enough" (19 Recordings/EMI) (1999) 
 "Teenage Attack" / "Cats & Dogs" (19 Recordings/EMI) (1999) [Japan only release]

Compilaation appearances
 Music From The Motion Picture Anywhere But Here (Atlantic) (1999) - "Scream And Shout"
 Now That's What I Call Music! 10 (EMI) (1999) - "21st Century Girls"
 EMI Summer '99 (Shit Va' Hits!) 3XCD (EMI/Chrysalis) (1999) - "21st Century Girls"
 EMI Summer 1999 (EMI/Chrysalis) (1999) - "Teenage Attack"

Final line-up
 Leanne Garner – Lead Vocals
 Fiona Garner – Bass / Vocals
 Kate Turley – Guitar / Vocals
 Meriam "Mim" Mohammad – Drums (previously Guitar) / Vocals

Previous member
 Charlotte Fendek – Drums

References

All-female bands
Musical groups established in 1996
Musical groups disestablished in 2000
English electronic music groups
19 Recordings artists
Musical groups from West Midlands (county)